Nives Meroi (born 17 September 1961 in Bonate Sotto) is an Italian mountaineer and a climbing writer. On 11 May 2017 she completed the ascent to the summits of all 14 eight-thousanders using the alpine style of climbing and without supplementary oxygen.

Climbing career

All of Nives's (and Romano's) 8,000 m climbs to the summits of eight-thousenders were completed without supplementary oxygen and without use of sherpas. 

In 2015 Nives published a book about their three expeditions to Kangchenjunga It. "Non ti farò aspettare. Tre volte sul Kangchendzonga, la storia di noi due raccontata da me" ("I won’t let you wait. Three times on Kangchendzonga, the story of the two of us told by me"). Later the book was published in other languages. Nives also wrote a book about their expeditions to Annapurna It. "Il volo del corvo timido" ("The flight of the shy crow")

List of eight-thousander climbs 

11 May 2017 summit of Annapurna
2016 summit of Makalu
2014 summit of Kangchenjunga
2009 the second attempt on Annapurna and the first on Kangchenjunga
2008 summit of Manaslu
2007 summit of Mount Everest, the first summit success of an Italian woman without bottled oxygen
2006 summit of K2 (the first Italian woman)
2006 summit of Dhaulagiri
2004 summit of Lhotse
2003 she is the first woman who succeeded in ascending all three eight-thousanders of the Gasherbrum massif (Gasherbrum I, Gasherbrum II and Broad Peak) during one season, within 20 days.
1999 summit of Cho Oyu
1999 summit of Shishapangma
1998 the first summit of the 8000s, Nanga Parbat
1996 the first attempt on Mount Everest, missed
1994 the first attempt on K2, she gained 8450 m

Personal life
Since 1989, Meroi has been married to Romano Benet, a climber and her partner in Himalayan mountaineering. Meroi and Benet live in Tarvisio in the Alps in northern Italy.

References

External links
Nives Meroi's website (in Italian)

Italian mountain climbers
Italian summiters of Mount Everest
Summiters of all 14 eight-thousanders
1961 births
Sportspeople from the Province of Bergamo
Living people